Olesya is a novelette by Alexander Kuprin written in late 1897 – early 1898 and serialized in Kievlyanin newspaper in October 30 – November 17, 1898. Olesya, the most acclaimed piece of his Polesye cycle, did much to build Kuprin's literary reputation and warranted his move to Saint Petersburg.

According to the Kuprin scholar Nicholas Luker, "Olesya is the most charming of Kuprin's rural tales. Though meant at first to be only part of the Volhynia and Polesye cycle, this poetic story of the love between an urban intellectual and a beautiful country girl expanded into a full novelette of a significance far surpassing that of the other regional tales." The story was one of Kuprin's favorites. Referring once to both Olesya and his later work "The River of Life," he said: "There is life in it and freshness and... more of my soul than in my other tales."

Background
In 1897 Kuprin went first to Volhynia Province in the northwest Ukraine, where he worked as an estate manager, and then to the Polesye area in southern Belarus. In the winter of 1897-1898 he moved to Ryazan Province, where Olesya was written. Kuprin considered several months spent in Volhynia and Polesye to be most beneficial of his life. "There I absorbed my most vigorous, noble, extensive, and fruitful impressions... and came to know the Russian language and landscape," he remembered.

The story is autobiographical. "All this has happened to me," Kuprin wrote mysteriously toward the end of his life.

History 
Olesya was first published in Kiyevlyanin newspaper (Nos. 300, 301, 304, 305–308, 313–315, 318) in late 1898 (October 30 - November 17). This original version of the work, subtitled "From the Memories of Volhynia," came out with an introduction alleging that this was the story told to the author by an Ivan Timofeevich Poroshin, now an old man, as he recalled his youthful love for the "real Polesye sorceress" Olesya.

In 1905 the novel came out as a separate edition, published by M.O. Wolf's Publishing house in Saint Peterburg, as part of the Library of Russian and Foreign Authors series (Issues 18 and 19). For it Kuprin removed the introduction, but otherwise this second version bore no difference from the original one.

In 1908, Olesya was included into the first edition of The Works by A.I.Kuprin which came out in the Moscow Book Publishers. Here Kuprin removed footnotes explaining details of the local dialect and changed several foreign words for their Russian analogues. Of the several minor additions one is of note: to Yarmola's words describing Manuylikha (Olesya's grandmother) "... But she was an outsider, anyway, from Katsaps" - "...or perhaps Gypsies," was added.

Controversy
Published in Russkoye Bogatstvo (No 9, September 1898), "The Backwoods" was intended as the first work in the cycle, to be followed by Olesya. But the latter was not accepted by the journal, and Kuprin was obliged to place it elsewhere, finally serializing it in Kievlyanin 1898. ("The Werewolf" was published in Odesskie Novosti in 1901, this delay leaving the whole  cycle incomplete.)

The reason why Olesya was rejected by Russkoye Bogatstvo has never been explained. "It could be surmised that the magazine leaders disagreed with the way the peasants' mob (which tried to lynch Olesya) was portrayed there. Depicting the rural people as an ignorant, aggressive and cruel mob totally contradicted the Narodnik ideas which Russkoye Bogatstvo was at the time propagating," biographer I.Pitlyar suggested.

Summary
Ivan Timofeevich seeks restorative peace in Polesye, but gets only intolerable boredom, from which the prospect of meeting a real witch offers a welcome diversion. Once, having lost his way in the woods, he hits upon a hut where abide an old woman and her granddaughter, hated and feared in the village for alleged sorcery. The narrator, who is deeply intrigued and touched by the girl's natural beauty, intelligence, insight and indeed some uncanny talents, becomes a frequent visitor, much for the displeasure of the old woman. Ivan and Olesya become close friends, then lovers, sharing deep and passionate mutual affection, doomed from the start - as Olesya's cards had foretold her.

Both women live in constant fear of repression from the local authorities (their little house has been granted to them by a former landlord and now is to be retrieved by the new one) and aggression from the locals. Ivan manages to bribe a local policemen into leaving them alone for a while, but inadvertently himself causes great trouble.

Before the parting which proves to be imminent (Ivan proposes, but the girl declines), Olesya, just to please her lover suggests that she'd  go to the church - something she avoided all her life ("for it's for Him that our souls belong"). Ivan concedes that such a forfeit would indeed give him some satisfaction. After the service Olesya gets mobbed and beaten by the locals. Tearing off, she issues some threats. Next day hail falls and destroys the harvest. Horrified with the news brought by his servant, Ivan hurries to the forest hut only to see it abandoned, with just cheap red beads left to him hanging on a window as a memory token.

Characters
 Ivan Timofeyevich, "a shadowy but attractive figure whose ready irony at his own expense endears him to us," "a noble- hearted but weak-willed urban animal whose hesitant nature contrasts sharply with the bold decisiveness of Olesya's rural temperament." (Luker) Olesya the fortuneteller characterizes him neatly: "...though you're a good man, you're weak ... not a man of your word." 
 Yarmola, Ivan's drunkard servant and hunting companion. 
 Manuylikha, Olesya's grandmother who'd been driven from the village as a witch. "Almost a Baba Yaga figure - the traditional witch of Russian fairy tales" - she proves to be an intelligent, although rather unpleasant woman.
 Olesya. A girl brought up in the remote forests, untouched by civilization. An "idealized, romantic creation, the archetypal daughter of nature, as beautiful and free as the virgin forests to which she belongs" (Luker). Delightfully attractive as she is, Olesya is a mysterious creature acutely sensitive to the ever-changing moods of the forest around her. Her oneness with the wild beauty of nature lends her supernatural powers that Timofeyevich finds disturbing and sinister. She possesses the gifts of prophecy and hypnosis, and can unerringly foretell death. "Framed by the quietly evocative beauty of Polesye, his miraculous heroine stands out in brilliant relief against the somber hostility around her." (Luker)

References 

Novels by Aleksandr Kuprin
1898 novels